Abdoulaye Samaké (born 7 October 1996) is a Malian professional footballer who plays as a defender for Valour FC in the Canadian Premier League.

Early life
Samake was born in Bamako, Mali and moved to Canada, at the age of six. He initially moved to Montreal, but soonafter moved to Ottawa, where he was raised. Samake began playing youth soccer with the Gloucester Hornets, before joining Ottawa South United. Afterwards, he joined the Montreal Impact Academy.

College career
In February 2016, he committed to join Michigan University and play for the men's soccer team in the fall. He missed his entire freshman season in 2016 due to injury. He made his debut on August 25, 2017 against the William & Mary Tribe. He was a three-time Academic All-Big Ten selection from 2017 to 2019 and a two-time University of Michigan Athletic Academic Achievement selection in 2017 and 2018. In his senior season, he was named to the Big Ten Conference All-Tournament Team and was named Michigan's Club Man of the Year. He was able to graduate a semester early in January 2020, completing his degree in the School of Literature, Science and the Arts program.

Club career
In July 2015, Samake signed with the Impact's reserve side, FC Montreal, in the USL.

In 2016, he played with the Chicago Fire U23 in the Premier Development League.

In 2017 and 2018, he played in the Premier Development League with Chicago FC United (who replaced the Fire U23).

In February 2020, he signed with Pacific FC on the Canadian Premier League. In 2021, he won the CPL title with Pacific, although he did not play in the championship final due to injury suffered in the semi-final. In February 2022, he re-signed with the club for another season. In August 2022, he was named to the CPL Team of the Week. After the 2022 season, he departed the club.

In December 2022, he joined Valour FC for the 2023 season.

Career statistics

Honours

Club
Pacific FC
Canadian Premier League: 2021

References

External links

1996 births
Living people
Association football defenders
Malian footballers
Canadian soccer players
Sportspeople from Bamako
Soccer players from Ottawa
Malian expatriate footballers
Canadian expatriate soccer players
Expatriate soccer players in the United States
Malian expatriate sportspeople in the United States
Canadian expatriate sportspeople in the United States
Ottawa South United players
FC Montreal players
Michigan Wolverines men's soccer players
Chicago FC United players
Pacific FC players
USL League Two players
Canadian Premier League players
21st-century Malian people
Chicago Fire U-23 players
Valour FC players